New Braintree is a town in Worcester County, Massachusetts, United States. The population was 996 at the 2020 census.

History 
Before being settled by re-located residents of Braintree, Massachusetts, New Braintree was occupied by various Native American groups for at least 9,000 years. 

In 1669, the town of Braintree, located southeast of Boston, voted that each household would be granted an equal interest in the 6000 acres purchased to the west, to be known as "Braintree Farms". The town's lands were formerly a part of the Quaboag Plantation. In ensuing years additional tracts of land which were formerly part of Brookfield and Hardwick were acquired. The land was first settled in 1709 and was officially incorporated in 1751 as New Braintree.

It has been the home of the Massachusetts State Police Academy since 1992.  Governor Michael Dukakis had proposed and began construction of a controversial state prison in the late 1980s on this site, but was met with heavy opposition by the town, Boston-area radio talk show host Jerry Williams and a group called C.O.S.T. (Conserve Our Small Town). Governor William Weld was elected and ceased the construction of the prison. The state police training academy now occupies the grounds and buildings of the former Seventh-day Adventist Pioneer Valley Academy. In the photo shown, one can see the school's former boys' and girls' dormitories with the cafeteria in between and the water tower to the right of the boys' dormitory. The school opened its doors in September 1965 and closed in June 1983.

Geography

New Braintree is bordered by Barre to the north, Oakham to the east, Spencer to the southeast, West Brookfield and North Brookfield to the south, Ware to the southwest and Hardwick to the west.

Demographics

As of the census of 2000, there were 927 people, 318 households, and 267 families residing in the town. There were 328 housing units at an average density of 15.8 per square mile (6.1/km). The racial makeup of the town was 99.14% White, 0.22% African American, 0.11% Native American, 0.11% Asian, and 0.43% from two or more races. Hispanic or Latino of any race were 0.32% of the population.

There were 318 households, out of which 41.8% had children under the age of 18 living with them, 70.4% were married couples living together, 8.2% had a female householder with no husband present, and 16.0% were non-families. 13.2% of all households were made up of individuals, and 5.0% had someone living alone who was 65 years of age or older.  The average household size was 2.92 and the average family size was 3.14.

In the town, the population was spread out, with 29.3% under the age of 18, 5.8% from 18 to 24, 29.7% from 25 to 44, 26.6% from 45 to 64, and 8.5% who were 65 years of age or older.  The median age was 38 years. For every 100 females, there were 102.8 males.  For every 100 females age 18 and over, there were 102.8 males.

The median income for a household in the town was $54,844, and the median income for a family was $60,417. Males had a median income of $41,477 versus $26,136 for females. The per capita income for the town was $21,072.  About 4.0% of families and 4.6% of the population were below the poverty line, including 3.5% of those under age 18 and 2.6% of those age 65 or over.

The town's only restaurant, Reed's Country Store, has been owned and operated by Edward and Susan Reed since 1977.  Breakfast and lunch is served here and it has been a central town gathering point for years. Every September for the past 38 years the town has had a Country Fair in the Town Center.

Education
New Braintree is part of the Quabbin Regional School District, along with Barre, Hardwick, Hubbardston, and Oakham. Elementary school students attend Hardwick Elementary School from grades K–6, middle school students attend Quabbin Regional Middle School from grades 7–8, and high school students attend Quabbin Regional High School from grades 9–12.

New Braintree was formerly the home of the Pioneer Valley Academy, which lasted from 1965 until 1983.

Government

Notable people

Charles Allen, politician, established a law practice in New Braintree
Alexander De Witt, politician
Charles Delano, politician
Francis Roach Delano, politician
Charles Eames, diplomat
Jonathan Fisher, minister
Edwards W. Fiske, politician
Henry H. Kendall, architect
Calvin Pollard, architect
Rufus Putnam, military officer, lived in New Braintree

References

External links

Town of New Braintree official website
New Braintree information at Mass.gov
New Braintree Historical Society
New Braintree Country Fair

 
Towns in Worcester County, Massachusetts
Towns in Massachusetts